Kaigani Strait (also, Kaigahnee, Kaigan, Kaijani) is a waterway in the U.S. state of Alaska, the southern part of the strait between Long Island and Dall Island. The Alaska Native name, as reported by Etolin is 1833, is Kalgan.

Kaigani is the narrow passage extending from Dixon Entrance to Tlevak Strait and separating Long Island from Dall Island. Howkan Narrows is the narrowest part of the passage, with kelp-marked reefs, from American Bay to above Channel Island. The strait is little used except by small craft. The Kaigani Harbors are three indentations in the shore of Dall Island; they are all exposed southeastward.

References

Bibliography

Straits of Alaska
Straits of Prince of Wales–Hyder Census Area, Alaska